Strumień Godowski is a river of Poland, a tributary of the Mleczna.

Rivers of Poland